The ABC was a  light car planned in 1922 to sell for $300 but which never went into production.

See also
ABC (1906 automobile).
List of defunct automobile manufacturers

References

Vintage vehicles
Defunct motor vehicle manufacturers of the United States